Some of example of forming processes are:
 Forging
 Extrusion
  Rolling
 Sheet metal working
 Rotary swaging
 Thread rolling
 Explosive forming
 Electromagnetic forming
 Plastic extrusion
 Die_forming_(plastics)#Process
 Food_extrusion#Process

See also 
 
 
 Pedogenesis - soil forming processes